Vasalemma River is a river in Harju County, Estonia. The river is 63.5 km long and basin size is 395.6 km2. It runs into Gulf of Finland.

Trouts and Thymallus thymallus live also in the river.

References

Rivers of Estonia
Harju County